Weymouth Peace Garden is garden dedicated to peace in the seaside town of Weymouth in Dorset, southern England.

The Peace Garden is a multifaith community garden. It located to the south of Weymouth Harbour, close to Nothe Gardens and Nothe Fort. Immediately adjacent to the garden is Wellington Court, formerly Red Barracks.

The garden was opened on 24 April 2010 on the site of a former Quaker burial ground.

See also
 Hope Square
 Nothe Parade

References

External links
 Weymouth Peace Garden website

2010 establishments in England
Gardens in Dorset
Harbour
Harbour
Peace gardens
Community gardening in England
Cemeteries in Dorset
Former cemeteries
Quaker cemeteries